Almaden was a light rail station on the Santa Clara Valley Transportation Authority (VTA) light rail system.  This station was the southern terminus of VTA's Ohlone/Chynoweth–Almaden line, popularly known as the Almaden Shuttle.

Location
Almaden station is located near Winfield Boulevard and Coleman south of Blossom Hill in southern San Jose, California. It consists of an island platform, but only one of the two tracks were used in service.

History

This location was once home to a large lumber company and was the southern terminus of the Southern Pacific Railroad's "Lick Branch," which was abandoned in 1981. The station was closed on December 27, 2019, when the light rail was replaced by a bus service.

Station amenities
Bicycle parking
Payphone
Park and Ride Lot
Wheelchair accessible

References

External links

Former Santa Clara Valley Transportation Authority light rail stations
Santa Clara Valley Transportation Authority bus stations
Railway stations in San Jose, California
Railway stations in the United States opened in 1991
Railway stations closed in 2019
1991 establishments in California